Johan Daniel Valentiner Jokinen (born 20 June 1990 in Copenhagen) is a Danish racing driver, currently competing in the FIA Formula Two Championship.

Career

Formula Ford
Jokinen began his formula racing career in local Formula Ford championships where he raced a 10-year-old Van Diemen. He won the Formula Ford Junior Cup Denmark and finished as runner-up in Formula Ford Denmark taking 5 victories which was more than anyone else that year. He was at the end of the season presented the Tom Kristensen Trophy as the best rookie and was also awarded Talent of The Year 2007 by the Dansk Automobil Sports Union, Denmark's motorsport organisation.

His achievement of winning the Formula Ford Junior Cup granted him a free drive at the unofficial World Championships for Formula Ford at the Formula Ford Festival at Brands Hatch later the same year. After struggling in the qualification-races, which included a big shunt, he went through to the finals where he had to start 24th but as the race was interrupted by numerous accidents and safety car he could only manage 17th.

Formula Renault
In 2007 he participated in six races of the Formula Renault 2.0 Northern European Cup with KEO Racing. He finished in 41st place in the standings with thirteen points.

The following season, Jokinen competed in both the Formula Renault 2.0 Northern European Cup and Eurocup Formula Renault 2.0 championships with Motopark Academy & iQuick respectively. He finished fourth in the NEC standings, taking fifteen points-scoring positions in sixteen races, including a win in the eighth race of the season at Oschersleben. In the Eurocup, he took part in the final four races without scoring points. Even though he didn't manage to score any points he didn't finish off the season unnoticed as he during testing prior to the qualifying at both race-weekends were consistently within the top five drivers.

He decided to stay with iQuick for the winter testing and the 2009 season as they merged with the famous Formula Renault 3.5 team Draco Racing to become Draco Junior Team. Jokinen was appointed the team's first-driver and named as Draco Young Driver Project.
But as the team underperformed and met economical misfortune Jokinen left the team already after the second round at Spa-Francorshamps.

Formula Three Euroseries
Jokinen made the full-time step-up to Formula Three when he was signed by Kolles & Heinz Union for a Formula Three Euroseries campaign, after Robert Wickens committed to the FIA Formula Two Championship and Jokinen had no other commitments following his departure of Draco. Jokinen finished 24th, without scoring points.

FIA Formula Two Championship
After a successful winter testing programme, seeing the Danish driver being at the top of the timing sheets more than once, he signed on for a full-time engagement in the series only a few weeks before the season kicked off. After having dealt with technical difficulties, misfortune and accidents on track, Jokinen was then sidelined with a complicated fracture on the left first toe after suffering an accident during training.
During the six races he participated in prior to the accident he only finished two, taking home a third and seventh place at respectively race 2 at Silverstone and race 1 at Monza. At Monza, however, he was leading the race after having performed an overtaking manoeuvre on the leader driver during the first lap – which stands as the only direct overtaking for the lead after the first corner in the new era of Formula Two – before being handed a drive-through penalty following wrong instructions from the marshals when getting to his grid position.

Personal life
Currently Jokinen resides in Aarhus after having lived most of his life in Copenhagen. 2009 has so far been the only time where he permanently stayed at another country but Denmark, after having lived at Viareggio in Italy for 8 months to train at the highly rated training centre for drivers, Formula Medicine.
As a result of his year out of school Jokinen has suffered a minor setback in his studies, but will be able to finish them by 2011.

Besides studying, Jokinen occupies himself with a number of activities including skiing, cycling and football, but also has interest for activities such as books, cooking and music.

Racing record

Career summary

Complete Formula 3 Euro Series results
(key)

Complete FIA Formula Two Championship results
(key) (Races in bold indicate pole position) (Races in italics indicate fastest lap)

References

External links
 
 

1990 births
Living people
Sportspeople from Copenhagen
Danish racing drivers
Formula Ford drivers
Formula Renault 2.0 NEC drivers
Formula Renault Eurocup drivers
Formula 3 Euro Series drivers
FIA Formula Two Championship drivers
Euroformula Open Championship drivers
Manor Motorsport drivers
MP Motorsport drivers
Kolles Racing drivers
Motopark Academy drivers
Le Mans Cup drivers